Ferric EDTA is the coordination complex formed from ferric ions and EDTA. EDTA has a high affinity for ferric ions.  It is a yellow solid that gives yellowish aqueous solutions.

Synthesis and structure
Solutions of Fe(III)-EDTA are produced by combining ferrous salts and aqueous solutions of EDTA known as Jacobson's solution (cf. chemical equation (1) under Table (1)).

Near neutral pH, the principal complex is [Fe(EDTA)(H2O)]−, although most sources ignore the aquo ligand. The [Fe(EDTA)(H2O)]− anion has been crystallized with many cations, e.g., the trihydrate Na[Fe(EDTA)(H2O)].2H2O.  The salts as well as the solutions are yellow-brown. Provided the nutrient solution in which the [Fe(EDTA)(H2O)]− complex will be used has a pH of at least 5.5, all the uncomplexed iron, as a result of incomplete synthesis reaction, will still change into the chelated ferric form.

Uses
In contact with aerated natural waters, iron salts convert to the ferric form.  Near neutral pH, ferric ions form insoluble solids and are thus not bioavailable.  EDTA (and other chelating agents) address this problem, by forming soluble complexes that resist formation of hydroxides.

Together with pentetic acid (DTPA), EDTA is widely used for sequestering metal ions. Otherwise these metal ions catalyze the decomposition of hydrogen peroxide, which is used to bleach pulp in papermaking. Several million kilograms EDTA are produced for this purpose annually.

Iron chelate is commonly used for agricultural purposes to treat chlorosis, a condition in which leaves produce insufficient chlorophyll. Iron and ligand are absorbed separately by the plant roots whereby the highly stable ferric chelate is first reduced to the less stable ferrous chelate.   In horticulture, iron chelate is often referred to as 'sequestered iron' and is used as a plant tonic, often mixed with other nutrients and plant foods (e.g. seaweed).   It is recommended in ornamental horticulture for feeding ericaceous plants like Rhododendrons if they are growing in calcareous soils.  The sequestered iron is available to the ericaceous plants, without adjusting the soil's pH, and thus, lime-induced chlorosis is prevented.

Ferric EDTA can be used as a component for the Hoagland solution or the Long Ashton Nutrient Solution. According to Jacobson (1951), the stability of ferric EDTA was tested by adding 5 ppm iron, as the complex, to Hoagland's solution at various pH values. No loss of iron occurred below pH 6. In addition to Jacobson's original recipe and a modified protocol by Steiner and van Winden (1970), an updated version for producing the ferric EDTA complex is presented in Table (1).

Jacobson's solution
Table (1) to prepare the ferric EDTA stock solution

The formation of Fe(III)-EDTA (FeY)− can be described as follows:

FeSO4∙7H2O  +  K2H2Y  +  1/4 O2  →  K[FeY(H2O)].H2O  +  KHSO4  +  5.5 H2O (1)

Iron chelate has also been used as a bait in the chemical control of slugs, snails and slaters in agriculture in Australia and New Zealand. They have advantages over other more generally poisonous substances used as their toxicity is more specific to molluscs.

Ferric EDTA is used as a photographic bleach to convert silver metal into silver salts, that can later be removed.

Related derivatives
Aside from ferric EDTA, iron complex of EDDHA is used to make the iron soluble in water and, for the purposes of agriculture, accessible to plants.

In iron chelation therapy, deferoxamine, has been used to treat excess iron stores, i.e. haemochromatosis.

See also
DTPA
EDDHA
Tartrate
Citrate

References

Iron(III) compounds
Coordination complexes